Integrated care, also known as integrated health, coordinated care, comprehensive care, seamless care, or transmural care, is a worldwide trend in health care reforms and new organizational arrangements focusing on more coordinated and integrated forms of care provision. Integrated care may be seen as a response to the fragmented delivery of health and social services being an acknowledged problem in many health systems.

Central concepts 

The integrated care literature distinguishes between different ways and degrees of working together and three central terms in this respect are autonomy, co-ordination, and integration. While autonomy refers to the one end of a continuum with least co-operation, integration (the combination of parts into a working whole by overlapping services) refers to the end with most co-operation and co-ordination (the relation of parts) to a point in between.

Distinction is also made between horizontal integration (linking similar levels of care like multiprofessional teams) and vertical integration (linking different levels of care like primary, secondary, and tertiary care).

Continuity of care is closely related to integrated care and emphasizes the patient's perspective through the system of health and social services, providing valuable lessons for the integration of systems. Continuity of care is often subdivided into three components: 
 continuity of information (by shared records), 
 continuity across the secondary-primary care interface (discharge planning from specialist to generalist care), and 
 provider continuity (seeing the same professional each time, with value added if there is a therapeutic, trusting relationship).

Integrated care seems particularly important to service provision to the elderly, as elderly patients often become chronically ill and subject to co-morbidities and so have a special need of continuous care.

The NHS Long Term Plan, and many other documents advocating integration, claim that it will produce reductions in costs or emergency admissions to hospital but there is no convincing evidence to support this.

Collaborative care
Collaborative care is a related healthcare philosophy and movement that has many names, models, and definitions that often includes the provision of mental-health, behavioral-health and substance-use services in primary care. Common derivatives of the name collaborative care include integrated care, primary care behavioral health, integrated primary care, and shared care. 

The Agency for Healthcare Research and Quality (AHRQ) published an overview of many different models as well as research that supports them. These are the key features of collaborative care models:

Integration of mental health professionals in primary care medical settings
Close collaboration between mental health and medical/nursing providers
Focus on treating the whole person and whole family.

There are various national associations committed to collaborative care such as the Collaborative Family Healthcare Association.

Contrast to merging roles 
The proper integrating of care does not mean the merging of roles. It remains uneconomical to make a physician serve as a nurse. Besides, the opposite approach is strictly prohibited by accreditation and certification schemes. The mix of staff for the various roles is maintained to enable a profitable integration in caring.

Examples 
The United States Department of Veterans Affairs is the largest integrated care delivery system in the US.
Kaiser Permanente and the Mayo Clinic are the two largest private systems in the US.
Essential for the implementation of the integrated care programme is a framework that guides the process. In Ireland, the Health Service Executive (HSE) is implementing an integrated care programme according to a 10-Step Framework. This Framework is created along the recommendation of the WHO.

See also 
Case management (disambiguation)
Shared care
Team nursing
Integrated care system

References 

Health care